Angad Singh Bedi (born 6 February 1983) is an Indian actor and former model. He made his debut with Kaya Taran in 2004, an adaptation of a Malayalam short story by N. S. Madhavan, Vanmarangal Veezhumpol (When the Big Trees Fall). He has acted in the film F.A.L.T.U in 2011 and known for his roles in Pink (2016), Dear Zindagi (2016) and Tiger Zinda Hai (2017).

Early life
Bedi was born to former Indian cricket captain Bishan Singh Bedi. Angad Bedi has one elder sister, Neha, and two older half-siblings from Bishan's previous marriage – a half-sister named Gillinder and a half-brother named Gavasinder. He played cricket up to Under-19 level for Delhi. He studied at Gyan Bharati School, Saket, New Delhi and graduated from St. Stephen's College, Delhi. Subsequently, he began a career in modelling, and ventured into acting.

Career 
Bedi started his career with the film Kaya Taran, directed by Sashi Kumar in 2004. The film was set against the backdrop of 2002 Gujarat riots and 1984 anti-Sikh riots. The film won the Aravindan Puraskaram, given to the best maiden film-maker, for 2004 and Bedi's performance in the film was appreciated.

In 2005, he appeared in a cooking show called Cook Na Kaho on Star One as a host. He hosted Extraaa Innings T20 in 2010, a show telecasted in between the match sessions during the Indian Premier League (IPL) along with Ayushmann Khurrana. He appeared as a contestant in Season 3 of Colors' show Fear Factor: Khatron Ke Khiladi. He also hosted the first season of the reality television show Emotional Atyachar on UTV Bindass before being replaced by Pravesh Rana.

He returned to Bollywood in 2011 with the film F.A.L.T.U, directed by Remo D'Souza.  Angad is best known for his performances in works such as Ungli (2014) and PINK (2016). He was also seen In Tiger Zinda Hai with Salman Khan.

In 2017 he starred as lead in Amazon original series Inside Edge.

He was also a part of the film Gunjan Saxena: The Kargil Girl, the biopic of the Indian Air Force Pilot Gunjan Saxena, where he played the role of her brother as well as the film Soorma, the biopic of Sandeep Singh, the former captain of the Indian Hockey Team, where he played the role of his brother as well. The actor has been the part of "The Zoya Factor".

Personal life
In 2012, Bedi got arrested in a case of allegedly consuming drugs at a rave party at a Suburban Juhu Hotel. He tested positive along with 85 others for the consumption of cannabis and ecstasy and was later released on bail.

Angad Bedi began dating Neha Dhupia and the couple decided to get married  in a private ceremony at a Gurudwara on 10 May 2018. The couple have a daughter born on 18 November 2018 and a son born on 3rd October 2021.

Filmography

Films

Television

Web series

Music videos

References

External links
 
 

1983 births
Indian male film actors
Male actors in Hindi cinema
Indian male models
Indian male television actors
Male actors in Hindi television
Living people
Indian Sikhs
Punjabi people
Male actors from Chandigarh
Fear Factor: Khatron Ke Khiladi participants